Whitmore Village is a census-designated place (CDP) in Honolulu County, Hawaii, United States. The population was 4,887 at the 2020 census.

Geography
Whitmore Village is located at  (21.514550, -158.025358).

Demographics

At the 2000 census there were 4,057 people, 940 households, and 818 families living in the CDP. The racial makup of the CDP was 5.10% White, 0.44% African American, 0.10% Native American, 65.89% Asian, 6.53% Pacific Islander, 0.96% from other races, and 20.98% from two or more races. Hispanic or Latino of any race were 7.59%.

Of the 940 households 43.6% had children under the age of 18 living with them, 64.8% were married couples living together, 14.6% had a female householder with no husband present, and 12.9% were non-families. 9.8% of households were one person and 5.5% were one person aged 65 or older.  The average household size was 4.28 and the average family size was 4.39.

The age distribution was 29.9% under the age of 18, 9.6% from 18 to 24, 27.5% from 25 to 44, 19.9% from 45 to 64, and 13.1% 65 or older.  The median age was 34 years. For every 100 females there were 101.1 males.  For every 100 females age 18 and over, there were 99.0 males.

The median household income was $52,308 and the median family income  was $55,508. Males had a median income of $27,885 versus $23,139 for females. The per capita income for the CDP was $14,315.  About 7.5% of families and 11.1% of the population were below the poverty line, including 13.9% of those under age 18 and 11.4% of those age 65 or over.

Education
Hawaii Department of Education operates Helemano Elementary School in Whitmore Village CDP.

References

Census-designated places in Honolulu County, Hawaii